The 1993 World Junior Figure Skating Championships were held on December 1–6, 1992 in Seoul, South Korea. The event was sanctioned by the International Skating Union and open to ISU member nations. Medals were awarded in the disciplines of men's singles, ladies' singles, pair skating, and ice dancing.

Results

Men

Ladies

Pairs

Ice dancing

References

 Patinage Magazine, N°36 mars-avril 1993, pp. 62–63

World Junior Figure Skating Championships
World Junior
World Junior
International figure skating competitions hosted by South Korea